Leadville Gunslinger is a 1952 American Western film directed by Harry Keller and starring Allan Lane, Elaine Riley and Eddy Waller.

The film's art direction was by Fred A. Ritter

Plot

Cast
 Allan Lane as U. S. Marshal Rocky Lane
Black Jack as Rocky's Horse 
 Eddy Waller as Nugget Clark  
 Grant Withers as Jonathan Graves  
 Elaine Riley as Carol Davis  
 Roy Barcroft as Chet Yonker / Pete Yonker  
 Richard Crane as Jim Blanchard  
 I. Stanford Jolley as Cliff Saunders  
 Kenneth MacDonald as Sheriff Nichols  
 Mickey Simpson as Henchman Monk  
 Ed Hinton as Deputy Ned Smith  
 Art Dillard as Sentry  
 Wes Hudman as Stagecoach Driver 
 Al Ferguson as Peters  
 Frank O'Connor as Murdered Banker

References

Bibliography
 Bernard A. Drew. Motion Picture Series and Sequels: A Reference Guide. Routledge, 2013.

External links
 

1952 films
1952 Western (genre) films
American Western (genre) films
Films directed by Harry Keller
Republic Pictures films
American black-and-white films
1950s English-language films
1950s American films